Anita and Me is a 2002 British comedy-drama film directed by Metin Hüseyin and starring Chandeep Uppal, Kabir Bedi, and Anna Brewster. It is based on the 1996 novel of the same name by Meera Syal. It was released during a period of popularity for British Asian films, alongside such as East Is East and Bend It Like Beckham.

Premise
Meena Kumar, a 11-year-old Sikh girl, lives with her family in the predominantly white, working-class, fictional mining village of Tollington in the Black Country in 1972. Meena meets Anita, a white, 14-year-old girl whom Meena comes to idolise. However, Meena finds it harder and harder to fit in as her Indian heritage keeps on resurfacing, and Anita's new boyfriend proves to hold strong racist attitudes toward those he regards as "darkies".

Cast
 Meena Kumar – Chandeep Uppal
 Anita Rutter – Anna Brewster
 Mr Kumar – Sanjeev Bhaskar
 Mrs Kumar – Ayesha Dharker
 Deirdre Rutter – Kathy Burke
 The Yeti – Kabir Bedi
 Uncle Amman – Omid Djalili
 Auntie Shaila – Meera Syal
 Mrs Ormerod – Lynn Redgrave
 Reverend 'Uncle' Alan – Mark Williams
 Sam Lowbridge – Alex Freeborn
 Hairy Neddy – Max Beesley
 Nanima – Zohra Sehgal
 Sandy – Christine Tremarco
 Brenda – Lucy Pargeter

Production

The film is semi-autobiographical, based on Syal's upbringing in Essington, Staffordshire. Despite being set in the West Midlands, sizeable parts of the film were shot in the East Midlands, notably the Derbyshire town of Draycott.

Reception

Box office

Anita and Me opened in cinemas on 22 November 2002 and earned £1,753,880 to 226 cinemas in the UK by 29 December. At the end of its opening weekend on 24 November, the film grossed £453,613 and by 29 December, it had grossed a further £42,446.

Critical response
Anita and Me has received mixed reviews. On Rotten Tomatoes the film has an approval rating of 71% based on 7 reviews, with an average rating of 6/10.

Peter Bradshaw from The Guardian commented that "There are zany vignettes and comedy Indian relations galore, but the whole thing is very cardboard and stereotypical." Louise Keller from Urban CineFile Australia describes the film as "a sweet chapter in the life of a young girl battling to identify with her roots and environment".  David Edwards calls Anita and Me "a well-meaning but uneven film".  Vince Leo from Quipster has described the film as "a perfect example of a coming-of-age film".  Rich Cline of Shadow on the Wall describes the film as being "enjoyable and funny, but there's not that much to it".

Home video
The film has been released in VHS and DVD format. The DVD was released in the UK on 26 May 2003 by Icon Home Entertainment.  It was also released on DVD on 8 August 2006 by Image Entertainment.

References

External links
 
 Anita and Me at Yahoo! Movies

2002 films
2000s Hindi-language films
2000s female buddy films
2000s coming-of-age comedy-drama films
British female buddy films
British coming-of-age comedy-drama films
British Indian films
Films about immigration
Films about women in the Indian diaspora
Films set in 1972
Films set in England
Films about Sikhism
Films based on British novels
2000s English-language films
2000s British films